Foróige is an Irish organisation whose purpose is "to enable young people to involve themselves consciously and actively in their development and in the development of society". In 1981, the organisation changed its name to Foróige, derived from forbairt na hóige, which means "development of youth".

History

The first club
The first club was formed in the town of Mooncoin, Co. Kilkenny on  where the local school held a youth club for the schoolchildren. As this was a success, another 12 pilot clubs came together and in 1953, Macra na Tuaithe was created.

Funding and grants
In 1958, the W.K. Kellogg Foundation in America secured a £30,000 grant to help fund an expansion of Macra na Tuaithe activities. In 1963, the organisation received its first funding from the Department of Education.

Expansion and name change
In 1971, Macra na Tuaithe began its expansion into urban areas with the opening of a permanent headquarters in Dublin, and developed the decision to build more Foróige clubs in urban areas. The first national conference for the organisation's volunteers took place in Termonfeckin, County Louth and this still continues today. In 1981, Marca na Tuaithe was renamed Foróige and the result of this change was to facilitate further expansion into growing urban areas.

Change of governance
In 2015, Foróige changed its governance from an association into a company limited by guarantee.  This change enhanced the role the volunteers play in the organisation.

References

Youth organisations based in the Republic of Ireland
Non-profit organisations based in Ireland
Organizations established in 1952
1952 establishments in Ireland